The 2002 Winter Olympics, officially the XIX Olympic Winter Games and commonly known as Salt Lake 2002 (Gosiute Shoshoni: Tit'-so-pi 2002; ; Shoshoni: Soónkahni 2002), was an international winter multi-sport event that was held from February 8 to 24, 2002 in and around Salt Lake City, Utah, United States.

Salt Lake City was selected as the host city in June 1995 at the 104th IOC Session. They were the eighth Olympics to be hosted by the United States, and the most recent to be held in the country (Los Angeles will host the future 2028 Summer Olympics). The 2002 Winter Olympics and Paralympics were both organized by the Salt Lake Organizing Committee (SLOC), the first time that both events were organized by a single committee.

The Games featured 2,399 athletes from 78 nations, participating in 78 events in 15 disciplines. Norway topped the medal table, with 13 gold and 25 medals overall, while Germany finished with the most total medals, winning 36 (with 12 of them gold). The hosting United States was third by gold medals and second by overall medals, with 10 and 34 respectively. Australia notably became the first Southern Hemisphere country to ever win gold medals at the Winter Olympics.

The Games finished with a budgetary surplus of US$40 million; the surplus was used to fund the formation of the Utah Athletic Foundation—which has continued to maintain the facilities built for these Olympics. The venues have continued to be used for national and international winter sports events after the Olympics, while the United States Olympic & Paralympic Committee has backed the possibility of Salt Lake City bidding for a future Winter Olympics.

Host city selection

Salt Lake City was chosen over Québec City, Canada; Sion, Switzerland; and Östersund, Sweden, on June 16, 1995, at the 104th IOC Session in Budapest, Hungary. Salt Lake City had previously come in second during the bids for the 1998 Winter Olympics, awarded to Nagano, Japan, and had offered to be the provisional host of the 1976 Winter Olympics when the original host, Denver, Colorado, withdrew. The 1976 Winter Olympics were ultimately awarded to Innsbruck, Austria.

There was a scandal involving allegations of bribery used to win the rights to the Games. Prior to its successful bid, Salt Lake City had attempted four times to secure the games, failing each time. In 1998, members of the International Olympic Committee (IOC) were accused of taking gifts from the Salt Lake Organizing Committee (SLOC) during the bidding process. The allegations resulted in the expulsion of several IOC members and the adoption of new IOC rules. Although nothing strictly illegal had been done, it was felt that the acceptance of the gifts was morally dubious. In addition, legal charges were brought against the leaders of Salt Lake's bid committee by the United States Department of Justice. Investigations were also launched into prior bidding process by other cities, finding that members of the IOC received bribes during the bidding process for both the 1998 Winter Olympics and 2000 Summer Olympics. In response to the scandal, Mitt Romney was hired as the new president and CEO of the Salt Lake Organizing Committee.

Development and preparation

Torch relay

The torch relay ceremonially began on November 19, 2001, with the traditional kindling of an Olympic flame in Olympia, Greece. On December 3, Greek skier Thanassis Tsailas lit the first torch from the cauldron, and transferred its flame to a ceremonial lantern for transport to Atlanta, where it arrived on December 4 to officially launch the U.S. leg of the relay. The route of the relay covered , passed through 300 communities and 46 U.S. states, and was carried by 12,012 torchbearers.

The torch was modeled after an icicle, with a slight curve to represent speed and fluidity. It was created with three sections, each with its own meaning and representation.

Budget
In February 1999, in response to the bid scandal and a financial shortfall for the Games, Mitt Romney, then CEO of the private equity firm Bain Capital (and future U.S. presidential candidate, U.S. Senator, and Governor of Massachusetts), was hired as the new president and CEO of the Salt Lake Organizing Committee. Romney, Kem C. Gardner, a Utah commercial real estate developer, and Don Stirling, the Olympics' local marketing chief, raised "millions of dollars from Mormon families with pioneer roots: the Eccles family, whose forebears were important industrialists and bankers" to help rescue the Games, according to a later report. An additional US$410 million was received from the federal government. U.S. federal subsidies amounted to $1.3 billion (for infrastructure improvements only), compared to $45 billion of federal funding received by the organizing committee of the 2014 Winter Olympics from the Russian government. The Games were financially successful, raising more money with fewer sponsors than any prior Olympic Games, which left SLOC with a surplus of $40 million. The surplus was used to create the Utah Athletic Foundation, which maintains and operates many of the remaining Olympic venues.

The Oxford Olympics Study established the outturn cost of the Salt Lake City 2002 Winter Olympics at US$2.5 billion in 2015-dollars and cost overrun at 24% in real terms. This includes sports-related costs only, that is, (i) operational costs incurred by the organizing committee to stage the Games, e.g., expenditures for technology, transportation, workforce, administration, security, catering, ceremonies, and medical services, and (ii) direct capital costs incurred by the host city and country or private investors to build, e.g., the competition venues, the Olympic village, international broadcast center, and media and press center, which are required to host the Games. Indirect capital costs are not included, such as for road, rail, or airport infrastructure, or for hotel upgrades or other business investment incurred in preparation for the Games but not directly related to staging the Games. The cost and cost overrun for Salt Lake City 2002 compares with costs of US$2.5 billion and a cost overrun of 13% for Vancouver 2010, and costs of US$51 billion and a cost overrun of 289% for Sochi 2014, the latter being the most costly Olympics to date. The average cost for Winter Games since 1960 is US$3.1 billion, average cost overrun is 142%.

Security

The 2002 Winter Games were the first Olympic Games to take place since September 11, 2001, which meant a higher level of security than ever before provided for the Games. As a result, the Office of Homeland Security (OHS) designated the Olympics a National Special Security Event (NSSE). Aerial surveillance and radar control was provided by the U.S. Marines of Marine Air Control Squadron 2, Detachment C, from Cherry Point, North Carolina. The FBI and NSA arranged with Qwest Communications to use intercept equipment for a period of less than six months around the time of the 2002 Winter Olympics.

When he spoke during the opening ceremonies, Jacques Rogge, presiding over his first Olympics as the IOC president, told the athletes of the United States:

Venues
Work on venues for the 2002 Winter Olympics began as early as 1989, following the passing of a state referendum that authorized the use of taxpayer money to publicly fund the construction of new facilities for a Winter Olympics bid in 1998 or 2002. Their construction was overseen by the Salt Lake Olympic Bid Committee and the Utah Sports Authority—a body created under the referendum.

New facilities built for the Games included the Utah Olympic Oval in Kearns, Utah Olympic Park in Summit County, The Ice Sheet at Ogden, and Soldier Hollow at the Wasatch Mountain State Park—the furthest competition venue from Salt Lake City. The E Center in West Valley City and the Peaks Ice Arena in Provo were also built with support from the SLOC, and co-hosted hockey.

Delta Center hosted figure skating and short track speed skating; it was renamed Salt Lake Ice Center for the duration of the Games due to IOC rules. Rice-Eccles Stadium at the University of Utah hosted the opening and closing ceremonies. The Olympic Village was built at historic Fort Douglas, whose land had been acquired by the University of Utah to construct new residences. The SLOC provided funding to the project in exchange for its use during the Olympics.

Main Street in Park City was converted into a pedestrian plaza during the Games, with festivities such as concerts, firework shows, and sponsor presences. Medal presentations took place in downtown Salt Lake City; the stage for the ceremony featured the Hoberman Arch, an arch-shaped metal "curtain" designed by Chuck Hoberman.

Transport
The largest public transport project completed for the Games was the TRAX light rail system, which first began operations ahead of the Games in 1999.

To help reduce vehicle traffic to Soldier Hollow and provide a special experience for tourists, Heber Valley Railroad offered a special train service to Wasatch Mountain State Park on steam locomotives during the Games. After arriving at the station, passengers then embarked to Soldier Hollow on horse-drawn sleighs.

The Games

Opening ceremony

The opening ceremony of the 2002 Winter Olympics was held at Rice–Eccles Stadium at the University of Utah on February 8, 2002. The facility was renovated and expanded for the Games. The Games were officially opened by President George W. Bush, who was standing among the US athletes (previous heads of state opened the Games from an official box), while the Olympic cauldron was lit by members of the gold medal-winning U.S. ice hockey team from the 1980 Winter Olympics in Lake Placid, New York (as made famous by the "Miracle on ice").

In an acknowledgment of the September 11 attacks, the ceremony opened with the entrance of a damaged American flag recovered from the wreckage of the World Trade Center, carried by an honor guard of athletes nominated by fellow members of the U.S. team (as with the main flagbearer), and police officers from the Port Authority of New York and New Jersey, the New York City Police Department, and firefighters from the New York City Fire Department. The flag was presented during the playing of the U.S. national anthem "The Star-Spangled Banner", as performed by the Tabernacle Choir.

The Olympic cauldron was designed to look like an icicle and was made of glass, allowing the fire to be seen burning within, reflecting the Games' slogan "Light the Fire Within" and an overarching "fire and ice" theme. Small jets send water down the glass sides of the cauldron to keep the glass and metal cooled (so they would not crack or melt) and give the effect of melting ice. The cauldron was designed by WET Design of Los Angeles, its frame built by roller coaster manufacturer Arrow Dynamics of Clearfield, Utah, and its glass pieces created by Western Glass of Ogden, Utah. The cauldron's cost was $2 million, and it was unveiled to the public when originally installed at Rice–Eccles Stadium on January 8, 2002.

Production for the opening and closing ceremonies was designed by Seven Nielsen, and music for both ceremonies was directed by Mark Watters.

Sports
The 2002 Winter Olympics featured 78 medal events over 15 disciplines in 7 sports, an increase of 10 events over the 1998 Winter Olympics. Skeleton made its return to the Winter Olympic program for the first time since 1948, while a women's event was contested for the first time in bobsleigh.

 Biathlon
 
 Bobsleigh
 
 
 Curling
 
 Ice hockey
 
 Luge
 
 Skating
 
 
 
 Skiing
 
 
 
 
 
 

Numbers in parentheses indicate the number of medal events contested in each separate discipline.

Participating National Olympic Committees

A total of 78 teams qualified at least one athlete to compete in the Games. Five NOCs made their Winter Olympic debut in Salt Lake, including Cameroon, Hong Kong, Nepal, Tajikistan, and Thailand.

Calendar

In the following calendar for the 2002 Winter Olympic Games, each blue box represents an event competition, such as a qualification round, on that day. The yellow boxes represent days during which medal-awarding finals for a sport are held. The number in each box represents the number of finals that were contested on that day.
All dates are in Mountain Standard Time (UTC−7)

Medal table

Podium sweeps

Records
Several medal records were set and/or tied, including:
 Norway tied the Soviet Union at the 1976 Winter Olympics for most gold medals at a Winter Olympics, with 13.
 Germany set a record for most total medals at a Winter Olympics, with 36.
 The United States set a record for most gold medals at a home Winter Olympics, with 10, tying Norway at the 1994 Winter Olympics.
All of the above records were broken at the Vancouver Olympics in 2010.

Closing ceremonies

The closing ceremony of the 2002 Winter Olympics was held on February 24, 2002, at the Rice–Eccles Stadium University of Utah closing ceremonies set designed by Seven Nielsen. It was narrated by Utah natives Donny and Marie Osmond (who voiced animatronic dinosaur skeletons designed by Michael Curry), it featured performances by a number of musicians and bands, including Bon JovI, Christina Aguilera, Creed, Dianne Reeves, Donny and Marie Osmond, Earth, Wind & Fire, Gloria Estefan, Harry Connick Jr., Kiss,  Moby and Angie Stone, NSYNC, R. Kelly, Sting, Willie Nelson, and Yo Yo Ma. It also featured appearances by figure skaters such as Kurt Browning, Dorothy Hamill, and Ilia Kulick, as well as dancer Savion Glover.

Departing from Juan Antonio Samaranch's tradition of declaring each Olympics the "best ever", IOC president Jacques Rogge began a tradition of assigning each Games their own identity in his comments, describing the 2002 Winter Olympics as having been "flawless".

Italian singers Irene Grandi and Elisa performed during the cultural presentation by Turin, host city of the 2006 Winter Olympics, while Josh Groban and Charlotte Church performed a duet of "The Prayer" as the Olympic flame was extinguished.

Highlights

 Competition highlights included biathlete Ole Einar Bjørndalen of Norway, winning gold in all four men's events (10 km, 12.5 km, 20 km, 4 x 7.5 km relay), Nordic combined athlete Samppa Lajunen of Finland winning three gold medals, Simon Ammann of Switzerland taking the double in ski jumping. In alpine skiing, Janica Kostelić won three golds and a silver (the first Winter Olympic medals ever for an athlete from Croatia), while Kjetil André Aamodt of Norway earned his second and third career golds, setting up both athletes to beat the sport's record with their fourth golds earned at the next Winter Olympics near Turin (Aamodt also set the overall medal record in the sport with eight).
 Team GB's victory in Women's Curling saw them win their first gold medal in any Winter Olympic sport since Torvill and Dean in 1984. 
 Ireland reached its best-ever position and came close to winning its first winter medal when Clifton Wrottesley (Clifton Hugh Lancelot de Verdon Wrottesley, 6th Baron Wrottesley) finished fourth in the men's skeleton event.
 A feature of these Games was the emergence of extreme sports, such as snowboarding, moguls, and aerials, which appeared in previous Olympic Winter Games but subsequently captured greater public attention.
 The United States completed a sweep of the podium in halfpipe snowboarding, with Americans Ross Powers, Danny Kass, and Jarret Thomas all winning medals.
 American Sarah Hughes won the gold medal in ladies' singles figure skating. Her team-mate Michelle Kwan fell during her long program and received the bronze medal.
 China won its first and second Winter Olympic gold medals, both by women's short-track speed skater Yang Yang (A).
 In the men's 1000m competition in short-track speed skating, Australian Steven Bradbury (who had won a bronze in 1994 as part of a relay team) became both the first-ever Australian, and the first-ever athlete from a country in the Southern Hemisphere, to win a gold medal at the Winter Olympics. Despite being off their pace, Bradbury benefitted from crashes involving his opponents in both the semi-finals and finals, with the latter occurring coming out of the final turn. A few days later in women's aerials, Australian skier Alisa Camplin won Australia's second gold medal.  After the Games, the phrase "doing a Bradbury" would become a local idiom for an unexpected victory in a sporting event at the expense of one's opponents, and was added to the second edition of The Australian National Dictionary in 2016.
Belarus's Vladimir Kopat scored a game winning goal from center ice against Sweden in the men's ice hockey quarterfinals, getting Belarus to their best place in international hockey so far.
 The Canadian men's ice hockey team defeated the United States team 5–2 to claim the gold medal, ending a 50-year drought without hockey gold. The Canadian women's team also defeated the American team 3–2 after losing to them in Nagano. In a post-game press conference after the men's gold medal game, Team Canada's executive director Wayne Gretzky revealed that a Canadian $1 coin (colloquially known as a "Loonie") had been secretly placed at center ice by one of the ice technicians. The "lucky Loonie" subsequently became a notable symbol of Canada's victory in the tournament.

Marketing
The overall branding of the 2002 Winter Olympics was based on a concept entitled "Land of Contrast — Fire and Ice", which featured a palette of warm and cool colors to contrast the warmer, rugged, red-rock areas of Southern Utah from the colder, mountainous regions of Northern Utah.

The emblem for the 2002 Winter Olympics was unveiled in October 1999, consisting of a stylized snowflake with segments colored in blue, orange, and yellow. The emblem was designed to resemble an Olympic cauldron and flame, as well as a sun rising from behind mountains. The orange center section of the flame was intended to reflect traditional Navajo weaving. The official event pictograms were inspired by branding irons, and the line thickness and 30-degree angles mirrored those of the emblem.

Mascots

The designs of the mascots of the 2002 Winter Olympics were unveiled on May 19, 1999, during an event marking 1,000 days until the opening ceremony.  The mascots represent three animals native to the western United States — a snowshoe hare, coyote, and American black bear respectively, with each mascot symbolizing a character from the legends of local Native Americans, and wearing a charm around their neck with an original Anasazi or Fremont-style petroglyph. For the first time in Olympic history, the names of the mascots were determined by a public vote, using name suggestions submitted by local students; on September 25, the names of the mascots were officially announced as Powder, Copper, and Coal respectively.

Media coverage
International Sports Broadcasting (ISB) served as the host broadcaster for the 2002 Winter Olympics; the Salt Palace convention center served as the International Broadcast Centre and press center for the Games. The IOC estimated that the 2002 Winter Olympics were viewed by over two billion people worldwide, with 13 billion viewer-hours watched.

In the United States, the 2002 Winter Olympics were broadcast by NBC Universal networks. They were the first Winter Olympics under a multi-year rights agreement between NBC and the IOC, under which it would hold exclusive rights to all Olympic Games from 1996 through 2008. The contract had excluded the 1998 Winter Olympics, as CBS Sports had an existing deal to exclusively televise the Winter Olympics from 1992 through 1998.

NBC partnered with HDNet to produce an eight-hour block of daily coverage in high definition, which was carried by HDNet and on the digital signals of participating NBC affiliates. Despite being held in a time zone only one hour ahead of Pacific Time, NBC still tape delayed much of its coverage for the west coast, although Salt Lake City's local NBC affiliate KSL-TV was given permission to air the live, east coast broadcasts to ensure their availability in the Games' host city.

Coverage of the Games by the Seven Network in Australia featured The Ice Dream, a comedy miniseries presented by the double act of Roy and HG as a follow-up to The Dream—their series for the 2000 Summer Olympics. The series featured a running gag of the duo proposing a bid for the 2010 Winter Olympics by the winter resort town of Smiggin Holes, New South Wales.

Legacy

Ski industry and winter sport

The 2002 Winter Olympics brought a huge amount of success to the Utah skiing industry. Since hosting the Winter Games, Utah has seen a 42% increase in skier and snowboarder visits –11. This increase resulted in direct expenditures from skiers and snowboarders growing 67% from $704 million in 2002–2003 to $1.2 billion in 2010–2011.

Fourteen venues were constructed or expanded in preparation for the Winter Games. One of the venues constructed for the Games was the Utah Olympic Park, which has proven to be one of the most successful venues to date because it has been maintained in top competition form. Owing to the routine maintenance of the park, Utah has been able to host a large number of winter competitions since 2002, including more than 60 World Cup events (e.g. the FIS Freestyle Skiing World Cup), as well as seven world championships, and various other sporting events. Hosting these high-profile competitions has resulted in approximately $1 billion being injected into the local economy. During 2013–2014, Utah held 16 various winter sport events, bringing $27.3 million to the economy of Utah. After holding the Olympics, Utah became home to two National Governing Bodies of Sport. The U.S. Ski and Snowboard Association is headquartered in Park City, Utah and the U.S. Olympic speed skating team is based out of the Utah Olympic Oval.

University of Utah expansion
The University of Utah was one of the hosts of the 2002 Winter Olympics; the planning committee approached the University of Utah and asked them to build several student dormitories which would serve as athletes' accommodation during the Games. It was agreed that the university would pay approximately $98 million out of the total required amount of $110 million to complete the construction. As a result, students of the university have benefited as almost 3,500 of them would be housed here after the Games. This was a great economic benefit to the university since the amount of money used to complete such dormitories could take long to be afforded. The university was also asked to expand Rice Eccles Stadium to accommodate 50,000 people up from 32,000. The university would then be refunded almost $59 million and be given an extra $40 million for its maintenance. 

The 2002 Olympic Games also benefited the university economically since the Salt Lake 2002 Olympic Cauldron Park was elevated by the renovations that took place. Ice rinks were very scarce in Utah, but they became plentiful and offered several entertainment and training opportunities for hockey players and figure skaters due to the Olympic Games. The Cauldron Park located at the University of Utah which was built with $6.5 million in profits and had the following features: a visitors' center which had a theater that showed a thrilling movie about the Olympic Games of 2002 and a "park" which had a dazzling pool and a V-shaped stone wall with the names of all the medalists of the 2002 Olympic Games. Besides, the park had 17 plates that hung on the stadium's fence celebrating the highlights of each day of the Olympics. All these features acted as tourist attraction that boosted the economic development of the university. In addition, it is indicated that the approximate value of media exposure through print during the Games was equated to $22.9 million. Mainly, this was a huge economic benefit to the university as more and more people got to know about the educational establishment, and this also boosted enrollment and future development.

Immigration
Holger Preuss in his book The Economics of Staging the Olympics: A Comparison of the Games 1972–2008 argues that "The export of the 'Olympic Games' service results in an inflow of funds to the host city, causing additional production which, in its turn, leads to employment and income effects." According to the study "2002 Olympic Winter Games, Economic, Demographic and Fiscal Impacts", the estimated creation of new job years of employment was 35,424, and additional earnings of $1,544,203,000. It was noted that the increase of Olympic related job started in 1996 and continued until 2003. These effects can be estimated on the ground of historical relationship between job and corresponding population growth. A lot of people migrated into the future place of the Olympic Games for expanding and favorable employment opportunities that the Olympics ensured. Although residents occupied many of the higher paying jobs created by the Games, many of the vacated jobs were filled by immigrants who relocated for the better employment opportunities.

Basically, the immigration rate was even larger because the employees immigrated with their families. The additional people paid diverse taxes and fees from their income, creating additional revenue on the state and local levels.

Employment
Olympic related jobs in Utah started in 1996 with slight job opportunities of less than 100. However, from the job measurement conducted from 1996 to 2002, steady attainment of job opportunities established and a maximum level was noted in 2001 where there were 12,500 job opportunities attained yearly, and approximately 25,070 jobs created in 2002. Therefore, from 1996 to 2002 the sum of employment equated to 35,000 jobs which lasted a year. February 2002 is when the highest employment opportunities were created compared to other years. There were around 25,070 job opportunities created compared to 35,000 created from 1996 to 2001.

It is difficult to quantify the impact of the 2002 Olympics on the unemployment rates in Utah, due mostly to the effect of the early 2000s recession. In 1996, the unemployment rate in Utah was approximately 3.4%, while the U.S. national average was 5.4% and by the end of 2001, the unemployment rate in Utah was around 4.8%, while the national average had risen to 5.7%. There was a high percentage of visitors to the Games, which raised the number of tourists whose consumption and demand prompted the establishment of job opportunities to meet the demands.

Proposed hosting of a future Winter Olympics
In 2017, an exploratory committee was formed to consider a Salt Lake City bid for a future Winter Olympics. In December 2018, the United States Olympic Committee (USOC, now the United States Olympic & Paralympic Committee [USOPC]) named Salt Lake City as its preferred candidate to bid for a future Winter Olympics, citing that its experience and existing venues could be leveraged. In February 2022, amid the 2022 Winter Olympics and the 20th anniversary of the Games in Salt Lake City, the USOPC stated that it was "already in dialogue with the IOC, not yet for a specific year but as part of their evolving process", and acknowledged that there was "very high excitement and support from the local population."

Concerns and controversies

Disqualifications for doping

The 2002 Winter Olympics were the first Winter Olympics held after the formation of the World Anti-Doping Agency, resulting in the first instances of athletes being disqualified for failing drug testing. Athletes in cross-country skiing were disqualified for various reasons, including doping by two Russians and one Spaniard, leading Russia to file protests and threaten to withdraw from the competition.

Pairs figure skating judging controversy

A major scandal emerged during the pairs figure skating competition; the Canadian pair of Jamie Salé and David Pelletier narrowly lost to the Russian pair of Elena Berezhnaya and Anton Sikharulidze, despite the Canadians being deemed the favorites to win after their free skate program. The French judge Marie-Reine Le Gougne alleged that the head of the French Federation of Ice Sports, Didier Gailhaguet, had pressured her to judge the competition in favor of Russia regardless of performance. Amid criticisms of the incident by both Canadian and American media outlets, and suspicions that this was part of a vote swapping scheme with Russia to benefit the French ice dance team, the International Skating Union (ISU) voted to suspend Le Gougne for failing to immediately inform officials of Gailhaguet's actions. They also recommended to the IOC that the gold medal be jointly awarded to both pairs. An IOC panel voted in favor of the motion, resulting in both Salé and Pelletier, as well as Berezhnaya and Sikharulidze, being jointly awarded gold medals.

Disqualification of Kim Dong-Sung

In the final race A, with one lap remaining and currently in second place, Apolo Ohno of the United States attempted to make a pass on the leader Kim Dong-Sung of South Korea, who then drifted to the inside and as a result, Ohno raised his arms to imply he was blocked. Kim finished first ahead of Ohno, but the Australian referee James Hewish disqualified Kim for what appeared to be impeding, awarding the gold medal to Ohno.

The South Korean team immediately protested the decision of the chief official of the race, but their protests were denied by the International Skating Union (ISU). The South Korean team then appealed to the International Olympic Committee (IOC) and the Court of Arbitration for Sport (CAS). The IOC refused to see the case, stating, "This is a matter for the ISU to decide on. At this time, the IOC has received no proposal and taken no action".

The disqualification of Kim upset South Korean supporters, many of whom directed their anger at Ohno and the IOC. A large number of e-mails protesting the race results crashed the IOC's email server, and thousands of accusatory letters, many of which contained death threats, were sent to Ohno and the IOC. South Korean media accused Ohno of simulating foul, using the Konglish word "Hollywood action". The controversy continued at the 2002 FIFA World Cup, held jointly in South Korea and Japan several months after the Olympics. When the South Korean soccer team scored a goal during the group stage match against the U.S. team, South Korean players Ahn Jung-Hwan and Lee Chun-Soo made an exaggerated move imitating the move Ohno had made during the speed skating event to imply the other athlete had drifted into his lane.

See also

 2007 Winter Deaflympics
 :Category:Competitors at the 2002 Winter Olympics

References

Notes

Citations

External links

 
 Official Salt Lake 2002 Legacy website  and archive of website on the Wayback Machine
 Olympic Legacy image archives – Utah State Historical Society
 2002 Olympic Winter Games Museum in Park City, Utah
 2002 Olympic Cauldron Park in Salt Lake City.

 
O
Olympics
Sports competitions in Salt Lake City
Olympic Games in the United States
Winter multi-sport events in the United States
Winter Olympics 2002
2002 in American sports
2002 in Utah
Winter Olympics by year
2000s in Salt Lake City
February 2002 sports events in the United States
Olympic Games in Utah
2002 in sports in Utah